Coxiella is a taxonomic homonym:

 Coxiella (bacterium), genus of bacteria in the family Coxiellaceae
 Coxiella burnetii, the causative agent of Q fever
 Coxiella (gastropod), genus of snails from saline lakes in the family Pomatiopsidae